is one of the five wards of Kumamoto City, Japan. The ward is located in the center of the city.

As of 2012, it has a population of 183,497 people and an area of 25.33 km2.

External links

Wards of Kumamoto